Krychaw District (Krichevsky raion) is a raion (district) in Mogilev Region, Belarus. The administrative center of the district is the city of Krychaw. In 2009, its population was 35,133. The population of Krychaw accounted for 77.4% of the district's population.

References

External links
 
 
 History of Krichev (Krychaw) in old photos at Krichev.gov.by
 Kryčaŭ county - landmarks and tourist attractions at Radzima.org

 
Districts of Mogilev Region